Rukhsar Rehman is an Indian film & television actress and model in Bollywood. Rehman made her film debut in 1992 at the age of 17 with a lead role in Deepak Anand's Yaad Rakhegi Duniya opposite Aditya Pancholi and also appeared in J.K. Bihari's Inteha Pyar Ki opposite Rishi Kapoor. However, at the request of her father, she left her career and moved back to her hometown Rampur in Uttar Pradesh to start a garment business.

In 2005, she returned to acting with Ram Gopal Verma's crime drama D, in which she played Randeep Hooda's girlfriend. She also featured in Verma's Sarkar the same year. In 2008, she appeared in Rumi Jaffery's God Tussi Great Ho as Salman Khan's sister. In 2009, she starred in The Stoneman Murders alongside Kay Kay Menon. Film critic Taran Adarsh in his review for the film called her a "complete natural". She also had supporting roles in Benny and Babloo (2010), Knock Out (2010), Allah Ke Banday (2010), Shaitan (2011) and PK (2014).

In television, she has featured in Sony Entertainment Television's medical drama Kuch Toh Log Kahenge (2011–13) as Dr. Mallika and in Life OK's Tumhari Paakhi (2013–14) as Lavanya. She did a cameo in Star Plus's Diya Aur Baati as Mehak. Rehman also did a critically acclaimed Malayalam film, Take Off (2017). She appeared in campaigns for brands like Kaya Skin Clinic, Asian Paints, Saffola salt and others.

Personal life 
She has a daughter, Aisha Ahmed, with her first husband, Asad Ahmed. Since 2010, she married to film director Faruk Kabir, but got a divorce from him in 2023.

Aisha was seen in 3 Storeys, Adulting on YouTube, Shockers, and Selfie, co-starring Amyra Dastur and Neha Mahajan.

Filmography

Films

Yaad Rakhegi Duniya (1992)
Inteha Pyar Ki (1992)
Sarkar (2005)
D - Underworld (2005)
God Tussi Great Ho (2008)
The Stoneman Murders (2009)
Accident on Hill Road (2009)
Thanks Maa (2010)
Benny and Babloo (2010)
Knock Out (2010)
Allah Ke Banday (2010)
Shaitan (2011)
Bheja Fry 2 (2011)
Life Ki Toh Lag Gayi  (2012)
PK (2014)
Love Games (2016)
Take off (2017) -Malayalam film
Uri: The Surgical Strike (2019)
The Body  (2019)
83 (2021)
 Khuda Haafiz 2 (2022)

Web series
 The Gone Game (2020–2022)
 The Night Manager (Indian TV series) (2023)

Television
Bhaskar Bharti (2009)
Kuch Toh Log Kahenge (2011–13)
Baal Veer (2012)
Tumhari Paakhi (2013–14)
Aur Pyaar Ho Gaya (2014)
Adaalat (2014)
Dream Girl (2015)
Diya Aur Baati Hum (2016)
Haq Se (2018)
Mariam Khan - Reporting Live (May 2018 - Jan 2019)

References

External links

21st-century Indian actresses
Actresses in Hindi cinema
Actresses in Hindi television
Actresses from Uttar Pradesh
Indian film actresses
Living people
People from Rampur, Uttar Pradesh
1970s births
Indian television actresses
20th-century Indian actresses
Actresses in Malayalam cinema